Mir Shekar (also Romanized as Mīr Shekār; also known as Gheyb ‘Alī) is a village in Qorqori Rural District, Qorqori District, Hirmand County, Sistan and Baluchestan Province, Iran. At the 2006 census, its population was 60, in 12 families.

References 

Populated places in Hirmand County